Red Shelley is a 1981 work of literary criticism by Paul Foot. In it, the author draws attention to the radical political stance of the Romantic poet Percy Bysshe Shelley, as revealed in poems such as "Queen Mab" and "The Masque of Anarchy".

Foot describes how Shelley, while living in Italy, heard the news of the Peterloo Massacre of 1819. Like Shelley, Foot was an alumnus of University College, Oxford (from which Shelley was expelled for expressing atheist views), and held the poet to be his inspiration in embracing socialism.  "The Masque of Anarchy", Foot's favourite poem, was given to his sons to learn off by heart, and a live performance by Maxine Peake at the 2013 Manchester International Festival, to commemorate the anniversary of Peterloo was the basis of a BBC Culture Show documentary which referenced Foot's work.

Communist thinkers such as Karl Marx are known to have found inspiration in Shelley's work. However, critics such as Christopher Hitchens have shed doubt on Foot's interpretation of Shelley's poetry, which "if [one doesn't] chance to know its context may be as readily pressed into service by any movement".

References

1981 non-fiction books
Books about Percy Bysshe Shelley
British non-fiction books